The Journal of Philosophy of Education is a quarterly peer-reviewed academic journal published by Wiley-Blackwell on behalf of the Philosophy of Education Society of Great Britain. The journal was established in 1967. The journal publishes articles relating to education or educational practice from a philosophical point of view. Specific topics addressed in previous articles include politics, aesthetics, epistemology, curriculum and ethics, and  historical aspects of the foregoing.  

According to the Journal Citation Reports, the journal has a 2018 impact factor of 0.798, ranking it 13th out of 34 journals in the category "History of Social Sciences" and 201st out of 206 in the category "Education & Educational Research".

References

External links 
 
Wiley-Blackwell academic journals
English-language journals
Publications established in 1967
Quarterly journals
Education journals
History of science journals
Philosophy journals
Philosophy of education